Peter Edward Cantrell (born 28 October 1962) is a former Dutch cricketer. He has represented Queensland in the Australian domestic circuit.

Domestic career
He also played 33 first class matches for Queensland and once for an Australian XI.

Cantrell is best remembered as a substitute fielder who took two catches during the Australia v England Test match at the Gabba during the 1990-91 Ashes series. In spite of the fact that Cantrell had apparently been at a nightclub until 3am that morning, one of these catches, which dismissed one of England's few batsmen in form at the time, Alec Stewart, has been described as a "blinder". England duly collapsed and lost by ten wickets in this the first Test, on their way to another heavy defeat in the series. ESPNCricinfo observes that, in an ironic partial anticipation of the Gary Pratt controversy of 2005, "Cantrell's presence was slightly controversial, given that he was probably the best gully fielder in Australia at the time and that the less sure-fingered Carl Rackemann was the official 12th man".

Two and half years later Cantrell helped to defeat "England" again, this time for a different international team, when he starred in a surprise seven-wicket win for the Netherlands over an England XI which included Darren Gough and then test players Nasser Hussain and Martin McCague, Cantrell scoring 64 and taking 2 for 40. 

This however was not in a one-day international and he had to wait another three years for his official international debut.

International career
He played all his five One Day Internationals for The Netherlands during the 1996 World Cup. He has scored 160 runs in his five ODIs with a decent average of 32.

Coaching career
He was coach of the Netherlands for the 2007 World Cup but stood down as head coach after the tournament.

References

External links

1962 births
Living people
Dutch cricketers
Netherlands One Day International cricketers
People from the North West Slopes
Dutch people of Australian descent
Queensland cricketers
Coaches of the Netherlands national cricket team
Australian cricket coaches
Dutch cricket coaches
Cricketers from New South Wales